Events in the year 1770 in Russia

Incumbents 
Empress – Catherine II

Events 
 Russo-Turkish war
 January – Russian troops in Focșani witness the first signs of a plague
 5–7 July – Battle of Chesma; The Russian fleet defeats the Ottoman fleet in Çeşme Bay near Çeşme
 7 July – Battle of Larga; Russians defeat the Crimeans and Ottomans on the banks of the Larga River
 1 August – Battle of Kagul; In the Kagul River near Cahul, in southern Moldavia, now Moldova, Russians score a land victory against Crimea and the Ottoman Empire.

References 

1770 in the Russian Empire
Years of the 18th century in the Russian Empire